Dead to the World is the eighth studio album by the American alternative metal band Helmet, released on October 28, 2016. It is the band's first studio album since Seeing Eye Dog (2010), as well as their first release on earMUSIC and their first one with bassist Dave Case.

The first song to be released from the album, "Bad News", premiered on October 5, 2016.

Reception
AllMusic's James Christopher Monger awarded it three out of five stars, and wrote "the veteran, genre-juggling metal outfit's first collection of new music in six years, Dead to the World continues in the vein of 2010's Seeing Eye Dog, introducing elements of shoegaze and Foo Fighters-esque alt-rock into their already sizeable arsenal of sonic weaponry." He further adds, "fans looking for a direct line to the band's 'Unsung' heyday will find that the alt-metal might that fueled their early recordings is no longer dialed in at 11, but Hamilton remains a compelling figure who is just as content engaging the listener's cerebrum as he is in landing a haymaker."

Pitchfork writer Saby Reyes-Kulkarni gave the album 6.8 out of 10. Kulkarni wrote that, "Hamilton takes more chances than he ever has on Dead to the World", and that, "going all the way back to 1994’s Betty—Helmet's only other album with genuine variation —Hamilton proved that he was actually capable of introducing melody into the band's vocabulary without dulling its edge. [Both] Betty and 1997’s Aftertaste contain examples of Hamilton ingeniously weaving vocals and riffs together, expanding while also staying true to Helmet’s core sound. Try, for example, to sing a song like 'It's Easy to Get Bored' while playing (or even air-guitaring) the rhythm guitar part without tripping up. In such cases, Hamilton’s experimental instincts and songwriting acumen came together seamlessly. That doesn't happen nearly enough on Dead to the World, where too much of the material stumbles in a confused attempt to marry Hamilton’s increasingly generic pop sensibilities with the savagery of classic-era Helmet. The two elements don’t gel, and both sound forced."

Track listing

Personnel
 Page Hamilton – lead guitar, vocals
 Dan Beeman – rhythm guitar
 Dave Case – bass
 Kyle Stevenson – drums

Charts

References

2016 albums
Helmet (band) albums
Edel AG albums